Aliabad Rural District is a rural district (dehestan) in the Central District of Anbarabad County, Kerman Province, Iran. At the 2006 census, its population was 7,968, in 1,727 families. The rural district has 17 villages.

References 

Rural Districts of Kerman Province
Anbarabad County